The Merchants and Citizens Handicap is a discontinued American Thoroughbred horse race which was first run in 1900 at Saratoga Race Course in Saratoga Springs, New York. Open to horses aged three and older, it was contested on dirt. The inaugural event was won by Orville Richards' gelding Charentus and the final running in 1960 by Gustave Ring's Don Poggio. In between them, some of the races most notable winners include U.S. Racing Hall of Fame inductees Roamer, Sir Barton, Exterminator (1921) and Discovery (1935).

The 1919 U. S. Triple Crown winner Sir Barton set a world record of 1:55 3/5 for 1 3/16 miles on dirt in winning the August 28, 1920 edition of the Merchants and Citizens Handicap.

Records
Speed record: 
 2:55.80 – Don Poggio (1960) at 1 miles
 1:54.60 – Reveille Boy (1932) at 1

Most wins:
 2 – Herbert (1901, 1902)
 2 – Sir John Johnson (1909, 1910)

Most wins by a jockey:
 6 – Ted Atkinson (1943, 1945, 1947, 1950, 1953, 1955)

Most wins by a trainer:
 6 – James E. Fitzsimmons (1914, 1930, 1933, 1934, 1940, 1941)

Most wins by an owner:
 4 – Belair Stud (1930, 1934, 1940, 1941)

Winners

References

1900 establishments in New York (state)
Discontinued horse races in New York (state)
Saratoga Race Course
Open middle distance horse races
Open long distance horse races
Recurring sporting events established in 1900
Recurring sporting events disestablished in 1961